Richard Ernest Evans (July 23, 1941 – October 24, 1985), was an American racing driver who won nine NASCAR National Modified Championships, including eight in a row from 1978 to 1985. The International Motorsports Hall of Fame lists this achievement as "one of the supreme accomplishments in motorsports". Evans won virtually every major race for asphalt modifieds, most of them more than once, including winning the Race of Champions three times. Evans was elected to the NASCAR Hall of Fame on June 14, 2011. As one of the Class of 2012, Evans is one of the Hall's first 15 inductees, and is the first Hall of Famer from outside the now NASCAR Cup Series.

Early career
Evans left his family's farm in Westernville, New York at age 16 to work at a local garage in Rome, New York. After he found early success in street racing, then became a winner in drag racing, an associate suggested he try building a car to race at the nearby Utica-Rome Speedway. He ran his first oval-track car, a 1954 Ford Hobby Stock numbered PT-109 (after John F. Kennedy's torpedo boat in World War II), in 1962. He advanced to the Modifieds, the premier division, in 1965, winning his first feature in the season's final night.

National championships
In 1973, Evans became the NASCAR National Modified Champion. In 1978, the "Rapid Roman" won a second title and did not relinquish his crown during the next seven years. Evans took over four hundred feature race wins at racetracks from Quebec to Florida before he was killed in a crash at Martinsville Speedway while practicing for the Winn-Dixie 500 tripleheader in late 1985 (three races in one day—a 200-lap Modified race, a 200-lap Busch Series race, and a 100-lap Late Model race). Before his fatal crash, Evans had clinched NASCAR's inaugural Winston Modified Tour (now known as Whelen Modified Tour) championship.

Regional championships
In 1982, NASCAR created the Whelen All-American Series, then known as the Winston Racing Series, to reward successful short-track racers and to provide incentives for them to support their local weekly short tracks, known now as NASCAR Home Tracks. A region-based series when Evans competed (now an international series, based on individual state and provincial champions), Evans won the Northeast Region championship all four years that he competed in it, from 1982 through 1985, but did not win the national championship.

Fatal crash and legacy
On October 24, 1985, Evans, who had clinched the 1985 National Modified title the week before at Thompson, was practicing for the Winn-Dixie 500 Modified Feature at Martinsville Speedway in Martinsville, Virginia (the races featured 200-lap Modified and Busch Grand National, and a 100-lap Late Model feature), when he crashed heavily in turn 3. The 44-year-old perished in the accident. The racing world was devastated by the loss of Richie, but his devoted fans have done much to keep his memory alive. Years later other deaths came in the Whelen Modifieds including Charlie Jarzombek at Martinsville in 1987, Corky Cookman at Thompson in 1987, Don Pratt at the Pocono R.o.C. in 1989 and Tony Jankowiak at Stafford in 1990, occasional competitor and two-time defending track champion Tommy Druar in a Lancaster event in 1989, Tom Baldwin, Sr. at Thompson in 2004, and John Blewett III at Thompson in 2007. As a result, officials made more safety features. Evans' crash, along with other fatal crashes in the late 1980s, led to questions about excessive frame rigidity of the Tour Modifieds, and safety changes resulted. In particular, straight frame rails were phased out, with new chassis required to have a step-up which could bend in hard impacts rather than transmitting all its impact force to the driver.

Though not recognized at the time, many racing safety experts have concluded that Evans' death resulted from the same type of "head-whip" injury and resultant Basilar skull fracture, which also claimed the life of Dale Earnhardt in 2001.

Evans was the father of six children: Jodi Lynn (Evans) Meola, Janelle Ralaine (Evans) Walda, Jill Ann Evans, Jacqueline Marie (Evans) Williams, Richard Edwin Evans (who has raced under the moniker "Richie Evans Jr.") and Tara Denise (Evans) Farrell.

Evans' signature orange Modified paint scheme (GMC truck color Omaha Orange; black numbers with white shading) was replicated in 2003 on a Busch Series car driven by New Jersey native Martin Truex Jr. in his first year on the series driving for Dale Earnhardt Jr.'s Chance 2 Motorsports. Steve Park also ran a Richie Evans tribute paint scheme for Tommy Baldwin Racing's No. 36 entry at the 2010 Coke Zero 400 at Daytona.

It was heard during the draw for an IROC race a few years back that they called the color of one of the cars "Evans Orange." That car carried a small "61" on the bumper cover in the same font used on Richie's last race cars. Ray Evernham Jr. raced against Richie in the Modifieds and also wrote the foreword in the "Richie! The Richie Evans Story" by Bones Bourcier; he also worked on them at the IROC shops in his native New Jersey and was involved with that aspect.

John Bisci's input:

"GM Omaha Orange matches his early coupes. Yes, people say it's Dupont Swamp Holly Orange but it's hard to find. When Richie built his last coupes and first Pintos, he switched to Ford Grabber Orange. Also, you have to watch what you use as a primer underneath – it bleeds through the orange or tints it. Never use gray primer under the orange! Richie used red oxide primer which would tint the oranges a little darker...."

On June 14, 2011, Evans was elected to the NASCAR Hall of Fame. He is the first driver who competed primarily in Modified-type cars to be elected to the HOF.

On January 20, 2012, Evans was inducted into the NASCAR Hall Of Fame, during which Darrell Waltrip said to the Evans family amidst his acceptance speech: "You know, Richie Evans, I want to congratulate the Richie Evans family; great job tonight. I watched Richie win race after race after race at Martinsville, and in my world is what I call a wheel man, and Richie Evans was the best wheel man I ever saw when he raced at Martinsville."

Awards and honors

Track championships
(30 championships at 11 tracks in 4 states.  All were in the Modified division on paved tracks.)
 Thompson Speedway (Thompson, CT): 5 (1980–81, 1983–1985)
 Utica-Rome Speedway (Vernon, NY): 4 (1972–74, 1978)
 Holland Speedway (Holland, NY): 4 (1978–80, 1982)
 Spencer Speedway (Williamson, NY): 4 (1977–78, 1983, 1985)
 Fulton Speedway (Fulton, NY): 3 (1970–71, 1974)
 Shangri-La Speedway (Owego, NY): 3 (1975, 1977, 1982)
 New Egypt Speedway (New Egypt, NJ): 2 (1979, 1982)
 Stafford Speedway (Stafford Springs, CT): 2 (1980–81)
 Chemung Speedrome (Chemung, NY): 1 (1978)
 Oswego Speedway (Oswego, NY): 1 (1983)
 Riverside Park Speedway (Agawam, MA): 1 (1980)

Other acknowledgements
 NASCAR Connecticut State Champion (1980–1981)
 NASCAR Winston Racing Series Northeast Region Champion (1982–1985)
 New Smyrna World Series of Racing Modified Champion (1977, 1979–1981, 1983–1984)
 2-time Daytona International Speedway Modified Race winner (1979–1980)
 3-time Modified Race of Champions winner
1973 – Trenton (NJ) Speedway (1.50 mile track)
1979 – Pocono (PA) Raceway (2.50 mile track)
1980 – Pocono (PA) Raceway (0.75 mile track)

Feature race victories
(481 feature wins known in Modifieds and 2 in other divisions, at 40 tracks in 14 states and provinces.  One track with incomplete records has none of Evans' wins there included.)
 Shangri-La Speedway (Owego, NY): 66 (1972–85)
 Spencer Speedway (Williamson, NY): 49 (1969–85)
 Fulton Speedway (Fulton, NY): 42 (1968–77), and 1 Limited Sportsman win (1970)
 New Smyrna Speedway (New Smyrna Beach, FL): 39 (1976–85)
 Stafford Motor Speedway (Stafford Springs, CT): 38 (1975–85)
 Utica-Rome Speedway (Vernon, NY): 33 (1965–78)
 Riverside Park Speedway (Agawam, MA): 32 (1978–84)
 Thompson Speedway (Thompson, CT): 32 (1975–85), and 1 Supermodified win
 New Egypt Speedway (New Egypt, NJ): 23 (1976, 1978–1980, 1982–85)
 Lancaster Speedway (Lancaster, NY): 22 (1969–76)
 Albany-Saratoga Speedway (Malta, NY): 17 (1970–76)
 Islip Speedway (Islip, NY): 17 (1970–83)
 Oswego Speedway (Oswego, NY): 13 (1972–85)
 Holland Speedway (Holland, NY): 11 (1977–85)
 Martinsville Speedway (Martinsville, VA): 10 (1973–1983)
 Monadnock Speedway (Winchester, NH): 3 (1978–81)
 Pocono Raceway (Pocono, PA): 3 (1979 on 2.5-mile superspeedway, 1972 and 1980 on 3/4-mile oval)
 Bowman Gray Stadium (Winston-Salem, NC): 2 (1979–80)
 Caraway Speedway (Asheboro, NC): 2 (1973, 1979)
 Chemung Speedrome (Chemung, NY): 2 (1978)
 Daytona International Speedway (Daytona Beach, FL): 2 (1979–80)
 Freeport Stadium (Freeport, NY): 2 (1972, 1976)
 Hickory Speedway (Hickory, NC): 2 (1978–79)
 Oxford Plains Speedway (Oxford Plains, ME): 2 (1982, 1985)
 Seekonk Speedway (Seekonk, MA): 2 (1979, 1983)
 Trenton Fairgrounds Speedway (Trenton, NJ): 2 (1973, 1978)
 Catamount Stadium (Milton, VT): 1 (1970)
 Plattsburgh Speedway (Plattsburgh, NY): 1 (1971)
 Devil's Bowl Speedway (West Haven, VT): 1 (1971)
 Twin State Speedway (Claremont, NH): 1 (1985)
 Deux Montagnes Speedway (St. Eustache, Quebec, Canada): 1 (1979)
 Evans Mills Speedway (Evans Mills, NY): 1 (1970)
 Franklin County Speedway (Calloway, VA): 1 (1979)
 Kingsport Speedway (Kingsport, TN): 1 (1979)
 Metrolina Speedway (Charlotte, NC): 1 (1974)
 Riverhead Raceway (Riverhead, NY): 1 (1985)
 Star Speedway (Epping, NH): 1 (1979)
 Wall Stadium (Wall Township, NJ): 1 (1971)
 Weedsport Speedway (Weedsport, NY): 1 (1971, Evans' only win on dirt)
 Capital City Speedway (Stittsville, Ontario, Canada): multiple wins (records incomplete, none included in total)

Recognition
 Named No. 1 on NASCAR's Modified all-time Top 10 list (2003)
 Only retired number in NASCAR in any series – No. 61 on the Whelen Modified Tour (Unofficial).
 As part of NASCAR's 50th Anniversary celebration in 1998, Evans was named one of NASCAR's 50 Greatest Drivers of All Time.
 Selected by fans as NASCAR Modifieds' Most Popular Driver nine times
 International Motorsports Hall of Fame (1996)
 National Motorsports Press Association (NMPA) Hall of Fame (1986)
 New York State Stock Car Association Hall of Fame
 New England Auto Racers Hall of Fame inaugural 1998 class
 FOAR SCORE Hall of Fame: 1986 – inaugural class
 Oswego Speedway Hall of Fame (2000)
 As part of the 25th anniversary of the NASCAR Weekly Series in 2006, Evans was named one of the series' All Time Top 25 drivers.
 Nominated in the class of 2010 as one of the potential 5 inaugural inductees to the NASCAR Hall of Fame, July 2, 2009.
 Evans' No. 61 was retired at his home track – Utica-Rome Speedway in Vernon, New York in 2008.
 Nominated in the class of 2011 as one of the potential 5 inductees of 2011 to the NASCAR Hall of Fame, July 1, 2010.
 In the 1985 IROC Series, every orange car featured a '61' on the rear fender to honor Evans and his orange No. 61 car.
 Elected to the NASCAR Hall of Fame on June 14, 2011 with Cale Yarborough, Darrell Waltrip, Dale Inman and Glen Wood. 
 Inducted to the NASCAR Hall of Fame in Charlotte, NC on January 20, 2012.

Motorsports career results

NASCAR
(key) (Bold – Pole position awarded by qualifying time. Italics – Pole position earned by points standings or practice time. * – Most laps led.)

Whelen Modified Tour

Further reading
 Zanardi, Pete.  Stock Car Racing, April 1974.  (Richie Evans biography article.)

References

External links

 
 NASCAR.com profile
 Photo gallery
 NASCAR.com list of all-time Top 10 Modified racers

1941 births
1985 deaths
Burials in New York (state)
International Motorsports Hall of Fame inductees
NASCAR drivers
Sportspeople from Utica, New York
Racing drivers from New York (state)
Racing drivers who died while racing
Sports deaths in Virginia
People from Westernville, New York
Sportspeople from Rome, New York
NASCAR Hall of Fame inductees